The men's 3000 metres event  at the 1985 IAAF World Indoor Games was held at the Palais Omnisports Paris-Bercy on 18 and 19 January.

Medalists

Results

Heats
First 4 of each heat (Q) and the next 3 fastest (q) qualified for the final.

Final

References

3000
3000 metres at the World Athletics Indoor Championships